Craigdam is a hamlet in the Formartine area of Aberdeenshire, Scotland.

References 

Hamlets in Scotland